Vladimir Alexandrovich Marchenko (born 7 July 1922) is a Soviet and Ukrainian mathematician who specializes in mathematical physics.

Biography

Vladimir Marchenko was born in Kharkiv in 1922. He defended his PhD thesis in 1948 under the supervision of Naum Landkof, and in 1951 he defended his DSc thesis. He worked in Kharkiv University until 1961. For 4 decades, he headed the Mathematical Physics Department at the B Verkin Institute for Low Temperature Physics and Engineering of the National Academy of Sciences of Ukraine.

He was awarded the Lenin Prize in 1962, the N. N. Krylov Prize in 1980, the State Prize of the Ukrainian SSR in 1989, and the N. N. Bogolyubov prize in 1996. Since 1969 he is a member of the National Academy of Sciences of Ukraine, since 1987 of the Russian Academy of Sciences and since 2001 of the Royal Norwegian Society of Sciences and Letters.

Marchenko turned 100 in July 2022.

Work

Differential operators

Marchenko made fundamental contributions to the analysis of the Sturm–Liouville operators. He introduced one of the approaches to the inverse scattering problem for Sturm–Liouville operators, and derived what is now called the Marchenko equation.

Random matrices

Together with Leonid Pastur, Vladimir Marchenko discovered the Marchenko–Pastur law in  random matrix theory.

Homogenization

Together with E. Ya. Khruslov, Marchenko authored one of the first mathematical books on homogenization.

Integrable systems

Notes

Selected publications
 . The second edition was translated into English: 
 .

External links
 
 
 Biography

Scientists from Kharkiv
Ukrainian mathematicians
1922 births
Living people
Full Members of the USSR Academy of Sciences
Full Members of the Russian Academy of Sciences
Members of the National Academy of Sciences of Ukraine
Royal Norwegian Society of Sciences and Letters
National University of Kharkiv alumni
Lenin Prize winners
Soviet mathematicians
Recipients of the Order of Prince Yaroslav the Wise, 3rd class
Recipients of the Order of Prince Yaroslav the Wise, 4th class
Laureates of the State Prize of Ukraine in Science and Technology
Ukrainian centenarians
Men centenarians